The Hill sphere of an astronomical body is the region in which it dominates the attraction of satellites. To be retained by a planet, a moon must have an orbit that lies within the planet's Hill sphere. That moon would, in turn, have a Hill sphere of its own. Any object within that distance would tend to become a satellite of the moon, rather than of the planet itself. One simple view of the extent of the Solar System is the Hill sphere of the Sun with respect to local stars and the galactic nucleus.

In more precise terms, the Hill sphere approximates the gravitational sphere of influence of a smaller body in the face of perturbations from a more massive body. It was defined by the American astronomer George William Hill, based on the work of the French astronomer Édouard Roche. It is sometimes termed the Roche sphere.

The region of influence of the smaller body is shortest in that direction, and so it acts as the limiting factor for the size of the Hill sphere. Beyond that distance, a third object in orbit around the small object would spend at least part of its orbit outside the Hill sphere, and would be progressively perturbed by the tidal forces of the central body (e.g. the Sun), eventually ending up orbiting the latter.

For any given energy of the third object (considered to have a negligible mass) there is a zero-velocity surface in space which cannot be passed. This is a contour of the Jacobi integral. When the energy is low, the zero-velocity surface surrounds the second body (the smaller of the two) completely, which means the third body cannot escape. At higher energy, there will be one or more gaps or bottlenecks by which the third object may escape the second object and go into orbit around the first object. If the energy is right at the border between these two cases, then the third object cannot escape, but the zero-velocity surface confining it touches a larger zero-velocity surface around the first object at one of the nearby Lagrange points (forming a cone-like point there). At the opposite side of the planet it gets close to the other Lagrange point. This limiting zero-velocity surface around the second object is basically its Hill "sphere".

Formula and examples 

When eccentricity is negligible (the most favourable case for orbital stability), this becomes

In the Earth-Sun example, the Earth (5.97×1024 kg) orbits the Sun (1.99×1030 kg) at a distance of 149.6 million km, or one astronomical unit (AU). The Hill sphere for Earth thus extends out to about 1.5 million km (0.01 AU). The Moon's orbit, at a distance of 0.384 million km from Earth, is comfortably within the gravitational sphere of influence of Earth and it is therefore not at risk of being pulled into an independent orbit around the Sun. All stable satellites of the Earth (those within the Earth's Hill sphere) must have an orbital period shorter than seven months.

The previous (eccentricity-ignoring) formula can be re-stated as follows:

This expresses the relation in terms of the volume of the Hill sphere compared with the volume of the second body's orbit around the first; specifically, the ratio of the masses is three times the ratio of the volume of these two spheres.

Derivation 
The expression for the Hill radius can be found by equating gravitational and centrifugal forces acting on a test particle (of mass much smaller than ) orbiting the secondary body. When the test particle is on the line connecting the primary and the secondary body, the force balance requires that

The above equation can also be written as

Hence, the relation stated above

If the orbit of the secondary about the primary is elliptical, the Hill radius is maximum at the apocenter, where  is largest, and minimum at the pericenter of the orbit. Therefore, for purposes of stability of test particles (for example, of small satellites), the Hill radius at the pericenter distance needs to be considered.

A quick way of estimating the radius of the Hill sphere comes from replacing mass with density in the above equation:

The second approximation is justified by the fact that, for most cases in the Solar System,  happens to be close to one. (The Earth–Moon system is the largest exception, and this approximation is within 20% for most of Saturn's satellites.) This is also convenient, because many planetary astronomers work in and remember distances in units of planetary radii.

True region of stability 
The Hill sphere is only an approximation, and other forces (such as radiation pressure or the Yarkovsky effect) can eventually perturb an object out of the sphere. This third object should also be of small enough mass that it introduces no additional complications through its own gravity. Detailed numerical calculations show that orbits at or just within the Hill sphere are not stable in the long term; it appears that stable satellite orbits exist only inside 1/2 to 1/3 of the Hill radius. The region of stability for retrograde orbits at a large distance from the primary is larger than the region for prograde orbits at a large distance from the primary. This was thought to explain the preponderance of retrograde moons around Jupiter; however, Saturn has a more even mix of retrograde/prograde moons so the reasons are more complicated.

Further examples 

It is possible for a Hill sphere to be so small that it is impossible to maintain an orbit around a body. For example, an astronaut could not have orbited the 104 ton Space Shuttle at an orbit 300 km above the Earth, because a 104-ton object at that altitude has a Hill sphere of only 120 cm in radius, much smaller than a Space Shuttle. A sphere of this size and mass would be denser than lead, and indeed, in low Earth orbit, a spherical body must be more dense than lead in order to fit inside its own Hill sphere, or else it will be incapable of supporting an orbit. Satellites further out in geostationary orbit, however, would only need to be more than 6% of the density of water to fit inside their own Hill sphere.

Within the Solar System, the planet with the largest Hill radius is Neptune, with 116 million km, or 0.775 au; its great distance from the Sun amply compensates for its small mass relative to Jupiter (whose own Hill radius measures 53 million km). An asteroid from the asteroid belt will have a Hill sphere that can reach 220,000 km (for 1 Ceres), diminishing rapidly with decreasing mass. The Hill sphere of 66391 Moshup, a Mercury-crossing asteroid that has a moon (named Squannit), measures 22 km in radius.

A typical extrasolar "hot Jupiter", HD 209458 b, has a Hill sphere radius of 593,000 km, about eight times its physical radius of approx 71,000 km. Even the smallest close-in extrasolar planet, CoRoT-7b, still has a Hill sphere radius (61,000 km), six times its physical radius (approx 10,000 km). Therefore, these planets could have small moons close in, although not within their respective Roche limits.

Solar System 
The following table and logarithmic plot show the radius of the Hill spheres of some bodies of the Solar System calculated with the first formula stated above (including orbital eccentricity), using values obtained from the JPL DE405 ephemeris and from the NASA Solar System Exploration website.

See also 
 Interplanetary Transport Network
 n-body problem
 Roche lobe
 Sphere of influence (astrodynamics)
 Sphere of influence (black hole)

Explanatory notes

References

External links 
 Can an Astronaut Orbit the Space Shuttle?
 The moon that went up a hill, but came down a planet 

Equations of astronomy
Orbits
Tides